Zaza Navrozashvili (born February 27, 1992) is a Georgian Rugby Union player. His position is Prop and he currently plays for Provence Rugby in the Top 14.

References

1992 births
Living people
Expatriate rugby union players from Georgia (country)
Rugby union props